Tynaarlo (Gronings: Tynaorl) is a village and municipality in the Northeastern Netherlands. Although it is located in the province of Drenthe, many of its communities serve as suburbs of the neighbouring city of Groningen, capital of the eponymous province. In 2019, the municipality of Tynaarlo had a population of 33,698.

History 
The municipality of Tynaarlo was established in 1998 as the merger of the former municipalities of Eelde, Vries and Zuidlaren; it was supposed to retain the name of the latter, but after the two first voiced their discontent, the name of the smaller central village of Tynaarlo was chosen.

Population centres

Topography

Village of Tynaarlo 

It is situated between the three largest villages of the municipality: Zuidlaren, Eelde and Vries. Tynaarlo is located close to the motorway A28, which is a connection to the south and the west of the country.

In 2001, the village of Tynaarlo had 1,009 inhabitants. The statistical district of Tynaarlo, which also includes the surrounding countryside, has a population of 1,920.

Notable people 

 Menso Alting (1541 in Eelde – 1612), a Dutch Reformed preacher and reformer
 Lodewijk van Heiden (1772 in Zuidlaren – 1850), a Dutch admiral

Sport 
 Jaap Helder (1907 in Paterswolde – 1998), a Dutch sailor who participated in the 1960 Summer Olympics
 Roelof Koops (1909 in Zuidlaren – 2008), a Dutch speed skater who competed in the 1936 Winter Olympics
 Paul Matthijs (born 1976 in Paterswolde), a Dutch footballer with over 300 club caps
 Jos Hooiveld (born 1983 in Zeijen), a Dutch footballer with over 300 club caps
 Willemijn Bos (born 1988 in Eelde), a Dutch field hockey defender, team silver medallist at the 2016 Summer Olympics

Gallery

References

External links

Official website

 
Municipalities of Drenthe
Populated places in Drenthe
Municipalities of the Netherlands established in 1999